Brig. Gen. George Russell Callender (1884–1973) was an American physician and army officer. He was the commandant of the Medical Department Professional Service Schools in Washington, D. C. (now known as the Walter Reed Army Institute of Research), founding commandant of the Walter Reed Tropical Medicine Course.

Biography
Callender was born in Everett, Massachusetts on May 13, 1884. He graduated from Tufts College Medical School, Boston in 1908, was commissioned in the Medical Reserve Corps in 1912, and entered the service (US Army) on May 18, 1913. He graduated from the Army Medical School in 1913.  Afterwards he served in the Hawaii Department 1916–1918 and as a pathologist at Army Medical Center in 1939. Callender became the Assistant Commandant, then Commandant of Medical Department Professional Service Schools 1940–1946.  He was promoted to Brigadier General in March 1945.

He retired from the Army in November 1946. Decorations included the Distinguished Service Medal.  He was author of Malaria in Panama (1929).

Honors and awards
Callender was awarded the Richard Pearson Strong Palladium Medal by the American Foundation for Tropical Medicine in 1946.  As stated in the citation accompanying the award, "Brig. Gen. Callender's supervision, guidance and research in the school contributed directly to the achievement of the lowest sick rate of any army in the history of war. His initiative and effort were largely responsible for the creation of the course in tropical medicine and for the development of extensive research activities at the Army Medical School in 1941 before Pearl Harbor. As a result of the typhus vaccine developed in 1942 not a single United States soldier died of epidemic typhus fever."

General Callender was buried at Arlington National Cemetery, in Virginia.

See also

 American Society of Tropical Medicine and Hygiene

References

External links

 George Russell Callender at ArlingtonCemetery.net, an unofficial website 

1884 births
1973 deaths
American pathologists
United States Army generals
People from Everett, Massachusetts
Tufts University School of Medicine alumni
United States Army Medical Corps officers
Recipients of the Distinguished Service Medal (US Army)
Burials at Arlington National Cemetery
Military personnel from Massachusetts